The 1973 Pacific Southwest Open – Men's doubles was an event of the 1973 Pacific Southwest Open tennis tournament and was played on outdoor hard courts at the Los Angeles Tennis Center in Los Angeles, California, in the United States between September 17 and September 23, 1973. The draw comprised 32 teams of which four were seeded. Jimmy Connors and Pancho Gonzales were the defending Pacific Southwest Open doubles champions but did not compete together in this edition. Unseeded Jan Kodeš and Vladimír Zedník won the title by defeating third-seeded Jimmy Connors and Ilie Năstase in the final, 6–2, 6–4.

Seeds

Draw

Finals

Top half

Bottom half

References

External links
 ITF tournament edition details

Los Angeles Open (tennis)
Pacific Southwest Open
Pacific Southwest Open